This is a list of recipients of the TWAS Prize, awarded annually by The World Academy of Sciences (TWAS).

Summary

Agricultural Sciences

Biology

Chemistry

Earth Sciences

Engineering Sciences

Mathematics

Medical Sciences

Physics

Social Sciences

See also
 Nikkei Asia Prize
 Borlaug CAST Communication Award
 L'Oréal-UNESCO Awards for Women in Science

Notes

References

External links

 
 
 
 
 
 
 
 

 
Science and technology awards
Awards established in 1985
International awards